Matachí  is a town and seat of the municipality of Matachí, in the northern Mexican state of Chihuahua. As of 2010, the town of Matachí had a population of 1,710.

References

Populated places in Chihuahua (state)